The 1913–14 Indiana State Sycamores men's basketball team represented Indiana State University during the 1913–14 college men's basketball season. The head coach was Alfred Westphal, coaching the sycamores in his second season. The team played their home games at North Hall in Terre Haute, Indiana.

Schedule

|-

References

Indiana State Sycamores men's basketball seasons
Indiana State
Indiana State
Indiana State